Good Thing is the second studio album by American singer Leon Bridges. It was released on May 4, 2018, by Columbia Records. The album was supported by three singles: "Bet Ain't Worth the Hand", "Bad Bad News" and "Beyond".

Good Thing received generally positive reviews from critics and debuted at number three on the US Billboard 200. The album was nominated for Best R&B Album at the 2019 Grammy Awards. Its single "Bet Ain't Worth the Hand" won a Grammy for Best Traditional R&B Performance.

Singles
The album's dual singles, "Bet Ain't Worth the Hand" and "Bad Bad News", were released for digital download on March 13, 2018, with "Bet Ain't Worth the Hand" later sent to urban contemporary radio on April 10, 2018.

The album's third single, "Beyond", was released on April 20, 2018, it was later sent to urban contemporary radio on April 30, 2018.

Critical reception

Good Thing was met with generally positive reviews. At Metacritic, which assigns a normalized rating out of 100 to reviews from mainstream publications, the album received an average score of 74, based on 17 reviews. Aggregator AnyDecentMusic? gave it 6.9 out of 10, based on their assessment of the critical consensus.

Chris Willman of Variety gave the album a positive review stating, "The new album is not that drastically less of a classicist affair than Coming Home, when all is said and done, but this time it's a whole variety pack of retro". Luke Fox of Exclaim! wrote: "Leon Bridges' sophomore record rings as an endorsement of his range. And that's a great thing for Good Thing, which tempers its pop-radio ambitions with unique bends on the age-old love song in this super-tight, 35-minute ride." Tara Joshi of The Guardian said, "Bridges doesn't entirely leave behind his old-school roots, but, while Good Thing is hardly the next Blonde or, indeed, 24K Magic, it leaves you with a greater sense of who he is: loved-up, and striving for a level of ambition that feels within reach". Reviewing the album for Pitchfork, Olivia Horn said that "On Good Thing, Bridges has kept his heart on his sleeve but updated his parlance to something a little less affected, a little more believable". Joe Levy of Rolling Stone said, "Not everything works. "If It Feels Good (Then It Must Be)" and "You Don't Know" feel like fake Pharrell, which is some pretty thin plastic. But the closers—the skin-to-skin makeup sex ballad "Mrs." and the free-ranging autobiographical narrative "Georgia to Texas" (Bridges' second tribute to his mom in as many albums)—show how expansive and individual Bridges can be, even as he guns for the charts".

In more mixed reviews, Slant Magazines Zachary Hoskins stated: "The album falters when Bridges strays from his retro-soul wheelhouse." Kitty Empire of The Observer said, "Certain sections of Bridges's audience are likely to define themselves against modern forms, so there is a risk here. But Bridges handles the transition deftly". Kate Lismore of DIY commented that, "While he proves in spades that he's not merely a throwback artist who has to rely on nostalgia, the mishmash of sounds coming from the album does feel a little muddled at times".

Year-end lists

Industry awards

Commercial performance
Good Thing debuted at number three on the US Billboard 200 with 66,000 album-equivalent units, of which 59,000 were pure album sales.

Track listing

Notes
 "Bad Bad News" features background vocals from Austin Michael Jenkins, Joshua Block, and Ricky Reed
 "Shy" and "You Don't Know" features background vocals from Brittni Jessie
 "Lions" features background vocals from Victor Dimotsis
 "If It Feels Good (Then It Must Be)" features background vocals from Ricky Reed, Joshua Block, Austin Jenkins, and Brittni Jessie

Personnel
Adapted from the album's liner notes.

Musicians
 Nate Mercereau – bass, guitar (tracks 1, 2, 4, 5, 7), drums (tracks 1, 2, 4, 6), French horn, trumpet (tracks 1, 2), glockenspiel, strings (track 1), keyboards (tracks 2, 4, 6, 7), percussion (tracks 2, 4, 5), piano (tracks 2, 5, 10), organ (track 4)
 Steve Wyreman – guitar (track 1)
 Shaina Evoniuk – violin (track 1)
 Ben Schwier – piano (track 1)
 Joshua Block – drums (tracks 2, 3, 10), percussion (track 7)
 Jeff Dazey – saxophone (tracks 2, 10)
 Austin Jenkins – bass (tracks 3, 8), guitar (tracks 3, 8)
 Dan Wilson – synthesizer (track 3)
 Ricky Reed – synthesizer (track 5), keyboards (tracks 7, 8), percussion (track 7)
 Zachary Cooper – bass (tracks 6, 9), guitar (tracks 6, 9)
 Victor Dimotsis – drums (track 9), keyboards (track 9)
 Andrew Skates – bass (track 10)

Technical
 Nate Mercereau – recording (tracks 1, 2, 4, 5)
 Ethan Shumaker – recording (all tracks)
 Victor Dimotsis – recording (tracks 6, 9)
 Zachary Cooper – recording (tracks 6, 9)
 Joshua Block – recording (track 10)
 Manny Marroquin – mixing (all tracks)
 Chris Galland – mixing (all tracks)
 Robin Florent – mixing assistance (all tracks)
 Scott Desmarais – mixing assistance (all tracks)
 Chris Gehringer – mastering (all tracks)

Charts

References

2018 albums
Columbia Records albums
Leon Bridges albums